Survival of the Fittest (2016) was a two-night, two-city professional wrestling event produced by the U.S.-based wrestling promotion Ring of Honor, the 11th Survival of the Fittest. It took place on November 3, 2016 at the Arlington Convention Center in Arlington, Texas and November 4 at the San Antonio Shrine Auditorium in San Antonio, Texas.

Storylines 
   
Survival of The Fittest (2016) featured professional wrestling matches that involved wrestlers from pre-existing scripted feuds or storylines that played out on ROH's television program, Ring of Honor Wrestling. Wrestlers portrayed heroes (faces) or villains (heels) as they followed a series of events that built tension and culminated in a wrestling match or series of matches.

Survival of the Fittest is an annual tournament held by ROH.  For the 2016 event, the winners from designated tournament matches in Arlington, Texas advanced to a 6-Man Elimination Match the following night in San Antonio, and the winner of that match was declared Survivor of the Fittest, and received a future ROH World Championship match.

2016 Survival of the Fittest tournament participants

 Bobby Fish
 Cheeseburger
 Chris Sabin
 Colt Cabana
 Dalton Castle
 Donovan Dijak
 Jax Dane
 Hangman Page
 Kenny King
 Lio Rush
 Misterioso Jr.
 Punishment Martinez
 Rhett Titus
 Sho
 Silas Young
 The Panther
 Will Ferrara
 Yohey

Results

Night 1 – Arlington, TX

Night 2 – San Antonio, TX

Order of Elimination
 The Panther was eliminated by Dalton Castle
 Dalton Castle was eliminated by Punishment Martinez
 Jax Dane was eliminated by Lio Rush
 Punishment Martinez was eliminated by Lio Rush
 Lio Rush was eliminated by Bobby Fish

References

   

2016 in professional wrestling  
2016 in Texas
Events in Texas
ROH Survival of the Fittest
Professional wrestling in the Dallas–Fort Worth metroplex
Professional wrestling in San Antonio
November 2016 events in the United States
Events in San Antonio
Events in Arlington, Texas